Wolfgang Ipolt (born 17 March 1954)  is a German Roman Catholic bishop of Roman Catholic Diocese of Görlitz.

Life 
Ipolt was born in Gotha. He studied Roman Catholic theology and philosophy at University of Erfurt. On 30 June 1979 Ipolt became priest in Erfurt. On 28 August 2011 he became ordained bishop of Görlitz in Germany, replacing Konrad Zdarsa.

References

External links 
  
 Website by Priesterseminar Erfurt
 „Den Glauben zu den Menschen bringen“, Interview with Wolfgang Ipolt, in: Lausitzer Rundschau, 27 August 2011

Living people
1954 births
21st-century German Roman Catholic bishops
21st-century Roman Catholic bishops in Germany
Roman Catholic bishops of Görlitz